Afroeurydemus puncticollis is a species of leaf beetle. It is distributed in the Democratic Republic of the Congo and Ethiopia. It was described by Gilbert Ernest Bryant in 1933.

References 

Eumolpinae
Beetles of the Democratic Republic of the Congo
Insects of Ethiopia
Beetles described in 1933